List of military units raised by the state of New Hampshire during the American Civil War.

Infantry

 1st New Hampshire Volunteer Infantry Regiment
 2nd New Hampshire Volunteer Infantry Regiment
 3rd New Hampshire Volunteer Infantry Regiment
 4th New Hampshire Volunteer Infantry Regiment
 5th New Hampshire Volunteer Infantry Regiment
 6th New Hampshire Volunteer Infantry Regiment
 7th New Hampshire Volunteer Infantry Regiment
 8th New Hampshire Volunteer Infantry Regiment
 9th New Hampshire Volunteer Infantry Regiment
 10th New Hampshire Volunteer Infantry Regiment
 11th New Hampshire Volunteer Infantry Regiment
 12th New Hampshire Volunteer Infantry Regiment
 13th New Hampshire Volunteer Infantry Regiment
 14th New Hampshire Volunteer Infantry Regiment
 15th New Hampshire Volunteer Infantry Regiment
 16th New Hampshire Volunteer Infantry Regiment
 18th New Hampshire Volunteer Infantry Regiment

Note: 17th New Hampshire failed to complete organization; its two companies were transferred to 2nd New Hampshire.

Cavalry
 1st New Hampshire Volunteer Cavalry Regiment
 2nd New Hampshire Volunteer Cavalry Regiment

Artillery
 1st New Hampshire Heavy Artillery Volunteer Regiment
 1st New Hampshire Light Battery

Sharpshooters

 1st Company New Hampshire Sharpshooters [assigned as Company E, 1st United States Volunteer Sharpshooter Regiment]
 2nd Company New Hampshire Sharpshooters [assigned as Company F, 2nd United States Volunteer Sharpshooter Regiment]
 3rd Company New Hampshire Sharpshooters [assigned as Company G, 2nd United States Volunteer Sharpshooter Regiment]

See also

 New Hampshire in the American Civil War
 New Hampshire Historical Marker No. 236: Concord's Civil War Mustering Camps
 Lists of American Civil War Regiments by State

References

 
New Hampshire
Civil War